Unibank is the name of several banks:

Unibank (Armenia)
Unibank (Azerbaijan)
Unibank (Denmark)
UniBank (Ghana)
Unibank (Haiti)
Unibanka (Latvia)
Unibank (Moldova)
Unibank (Panama)
UniBank (United States)